Erik Bauersfeld (June 28, 1922 – April 3, 2016) was an American radio dramatist and voice actor. His most notable role was providing the voices of Admiral Ackbar and Bib Fortuna in the third film of the original Star Wars trilogy, Return of the Jedi (1983), the former of which he subsequently reprised in Star Wars: The Force Awakens (2015).

Early life
Bauersfeld was attracted to radio work at a very young age. During World War II, he served in the United States Navy. His post-secondary education included time studying at Cooper Union in New York, and then at the University of California, Berkeley, where he concentrated on aesthetics and painting.

Career
Bauersfeld was teaching at the San Francisco Art Institute, when he began working at Pacifica Radio station KPFA-FM in Berkeley, beginning in 1961. He served as the Director of KPFA's Drama and Literature Department for 31 years. Outside of radio, he dabbled in voiceover work in films and video games.

Bauersfeld was working at Lucasfilm on a radio project, with sound designer Randy Thom, when eventually he was approached by Star Wars sound designer Ben Burtt. Burtt asked him to read for the part of Ackbar. According to Bauersfeld, he was shown a picture of Ackbar and instantly came up with the character's voice. Ackbar's lines, including the memorable exclamation "It's a trap!", took an hour for Bauersfeld to record. He then spent an additional 30 minutes reading for the voice of Bib Fortuna, who was Jabba the Hutt's majordomo. Both of his vocal parts were added to the finished production of Return of the Jedi, but Bauersfeld received no screen credit at the time.

He was the last person to read for the part of Yoda, a role that eventually went to puppeteer Frank Oz.

He also voiced several characters in the 1979 Highbridge audio productions of The Hobbit and The Lord of the Rings.

Bauersfeld reprised his role as the voice of Admiral Ackbar in several video games (including Star Wars: X-Wing and Star Wars Battlefront: Elite Squadron), as well as in Star Wars: The Force Awakens.

Personal life and death
He was a close friend of poet and activist Lawrence Ferlinghetti. In 2015, he attended the Star Wars Celebration at Anaheim.

Bauersfeld died at his home in Berkeley, California, on 3 April 2016, at the age of 93.

Filmography

Films

Video games

References

External links
 
 http://bardradio.com

20th-century American male actors
21st-century American male actors
1922 births
2016 deaths
American male voice actors
American radio personalities
Male actors from New York City
Male actors from Berkeley, California
Pacifica Foundation people
People from Berkeley, California
People from Brooklyn
University of California, Berkeley alumni
United States Navy personnel of World War II